Norman Crag is a rugged nunatak 2.2 nautical miles (4.1 km) north of the summit of Mount Bird, Ross Island. The feature has a divided summit area and rises to over 1400 m. Named by New Zealand Geographic Board (NZGB) (2000) after Bob Norman.

Nunataks of Ross Island